Pama Fou (born 6 September 1990) is a professional rugby union player. His usual position is as a Utility back and he currently plays for italian team Petrarca Padova in Top10.

He represented Australia in Sevens Rugby. Born in Auckland, New Zealand and playing for Souths at a senior level, he debuted for Australia in October 2011. As of December 2015, he currently has 25 caps.

Pama Fou represented Queensland and made the Australian Institute of Sport squad in volleyball as a teenager before a persistent shoulder injury forced him to quit the sport aged 19. Two years later, coach Michael O'Connor plucked Pama from Brisbane rugby club Souths. Pama has played on the Sevens World Series circuit 14 times since making his debut at the 2011 Gold Coast Sevens and has been likened as the Sevens version of Wallaby superstar Israel Folau. Despite missing the 2013/14 HSBC Sevens World Series with injury, Pama was named in the 2014 Commonwealth Games squad and memorably scored the winning try in the come-from-behind win over Wales in the Cup Quarter-Finals.

In 2016 Fou signed with the Melbourne Rebels to play Super Rugby starting in 2017; he was given leave to train with the Australian Sevens, however a knee injury interrupted his Olympic preparations. In July 2016 he re-signed with the Rebels on a one-year contract.

Super Rugby statistics

References

External links
 
 
 
 

1990 births
Australian rugby union players
Commonwealth Games rugby sevens players of Australia
Male rugby sevens players
Australia international rugby sevens players
Living people
Commonwealth Games medallists in rugby sevens
Commonwealth Games bronze medallists for Australia
Rugby sevens players at the 2014 Commonwealth Games
Rugby union centres
Rugby union wings
Melbourne Rebels players
Western Force players
Sydney (NRC team) players
Petrarca Rugby players
Australian expatriate rugby union players
Expatriate rugby union players in Italy
Medallists at the 2014 Commonwealth Games